Anup Kumar (17 June 1930 – 3 September 1998) was an Indian actor who is known for his work in Bengali cinema.

Early life 
Anup Kumar was born on 17 June 1930 in Calcutta, British India. His real name was Satyen Das. His parents were Dhirendra Nath Das who was a singer and actor and was closely associated with the famous poet and composer, Kazi Nazrul Islam [1899-1976], and Bijoya Das. He passed his Matriculation at the Calcutta Jubilee Institution. In 1986, he married actress Aloka Ganguly.

Acting career 
Anup Kumar took his acting lessons from his father and Sisir Kumar Bhaduri. He started acting quite early in life. He got his first break as a child artist in Dhiren Ganguly's film Halkatha (1938). Palatak, Jiban Kahini, Alor Pipasa and Nimantran were the movies which exposed his versatility as an actor. He was also involved with live theatre, yatras, and film directing.

In 1964, he was awarded the BFJA Award for Best Actor for his performance in the film Palatak. He received a silver medal from the Star Theatre. In 1988, he won the West Bengal Natya Academy Award. In 1989, he was awarded with Siromoni Prize and in 1991, he was awarded Best Director for his yatras. In 1997, he was recognized by the BFJA Awards for completion of 50 years in films.

Besides his superlative performance in Palatak, Anup Kumar is also remembered for his brilliant comic timing. Along with the classic comedians like Nabadwip Haldar, Bhanu Bandopadhyay, Jahor Roy and Rabi Ghosh, Anup Kumar is much-admired comedic roles in films such as Basanta Bilap, Mouchak, Dadar Kirti, Protisodh. After the death of Rabi Ghosh, it was Anup Kumar who was cast as Jatayu, the famous friend of Satyajit Ray's detective Feluda.

Politics 
In 1996, Kumar stood for election to the Vidhan Sabha as a CPI(M) representative from Cossipore; but he was not elected.

Filmography

References

External links 
 

1932 births
Bengali Hindus
Male actors in Bengali cinema
Bengali male actors
Indian male film actors
Indian male comedians
1998 deaths
20th-century Indian male actors
Male actors from Kolkata
20th-century comedians